Sophia Frangou is a professor of psychiatry at the Icahn School of Medicine at Mount Sinai where she heads the Psychosis Research Program. She is a Fellow of the Royal College of Psychiatrists and vice-chair of the RCPsych Panamerican Division. She is a Fellow of the European Psychiatric Association (EPA) and of the American Psychiatric Association (APA). She served as vice-president for Research of the International Society for Bipolar Disorders from 2010 to 2014. She has also served on the Council of the British Association for Psychopharmacology. She is founding member of the EPA NeuroImaging section and founding chair of the Brain Imaging Network of the European College of Neuropsychopharmacology. She is one of the two Editors of European Psychiatry, the official Journal of the European Psychiatric Association.

Biography
Frangou graduated from the Medical School of the University of Athens, Greece in 1989. She then moved to the UK where she trained in psychiatry at the Maudsley Hospital, London. She obtained her master's degree in neuroscience from the University of London, UK and trained in the US as a research fellow at the Department of Psychiatry and Behavioural Sciences at the Johns Hopkins University She returned to the Institute of Psychiatry, King's College London where she completed her PhD on neuroimaging and electrophysiological markers of familial vulnerability to schizophrenia. Between 1997 and 2013 she worked as a Consultant Psychiatrist at the Maudsley Hospital and led her own research group at the  Institute of Psychiatry, Psychology and Neuroscience, King's College London.

Research
Frangou's research focuses on the pathophysiological processes underlying psychosis, with emphasis on schizophrenia and bipolar disorder using clinical, genetic, cognitive and neuroimaging techniques. Her key contributions in the field relate to the neuroimaging correlates of disease risk, expression and resilience and on the functional impact of susceptibility genes for schizophrenia and bipolar disorder on brain structure, connectivity and plasticity.

In parallel Frangou is also interested in the standardisation of neuroimaging measures to capture normal variation across the lifespan and to guide diagnosis, prognosis and treatment response. She currently co-chairs the ENIGMA Lifespan Working Group that examines normal variation in brain structure in over 10,000 healthy people aged 2–92 years

Recent publications

View article here

See also
 Institute of Psychiatry
 Maudsley Hospital
 International Society for Bipolar Disorders
 Icahn School of Medicine at Mount Sinai

References

External links 

 

1965 births
Living people
Alumni of King's College London
National and Kapodistrian University of Athens alumni
Greek neuroscientists
Greek women neuroscientists
Schizophrenia researchers
Fellows of the Royal College of Psychiatrists
People in health professions from Athens